Bistra (Bister, Bistra, Bistrica, Bistër) is a peak in the Šar Mountains found in Kosovo.

Notes and references
Notes:

References:

Mountains of Kosovo
Šar Mountains